The Milk Ogre is a 2019 Burmese drama film, directed by  Lu Min starring  Lu Min, Zay Ye Htet, Shwe Hmone Yati and Myat Mon. The film, produced by Aung Thiri Film Production premiered in Myanmar on March 29, 2019.

Plot
The story of the Milk Ogre curse is still accepted in some Burmese villages. The women living in that kind of village misbelieve that if a woman has a curse of milk ogre upon her, her baby will die by taking her breast milk. So, to avoid this tragedy, she denies to breastfeed her baby and rather sells the baby to someone else for adoption and then break the curse. The film was directed for the purpose of expressing this strange obsession.

Cast
Lu Min as The Milk Ogre
Zay Ye Htet as Phoe La Min
Shwe Hmone Yati as Byine Phyu
Myat Mon as Daw Swal Mi

Awards & Nominations

References

External links

2019 films
2010s Burmese-language films
Burmese drama films
Films shot in Myanmar
2019 drama films